Benjamin Joseph Keiley (October 13, 1847 – June 17, 1925) was an American prelate of the Roman Catholic Church. He served as bishop of the Diocese of Savannah in Georgia from 1900 to 1922.

Biography

Early life and education
Benjamin Keiley was born on October 13, 1847, in Petersburg, Virginia, to John D. and Margaret (née Crowley) Keiley, both natives of Cork County, Ireland. His older brother, Anthony Michael Keiley, served as chief justice of the International Court of Appeals in Cairo, Egypt. An educator, John Keiley converted to Methodism when the children were young.  As a result, Margaret moved out of the house with the children so as to raise them as Catholics.  

After receiving his early education in Petersburg, Benjamin Keiley entered the Confederate Army of Northern Virginia in 1864 at age 17 during the American Civil War. He served in an artillery unit during the last year of the war. 

When the war ended, Keiley was a law clerk before attending the minor seminary, St. Charles College in Ellicott City, Maryland.  He then travelled to Rome to attend the Pontifical North American College in 1869.

Ordination and ministry
Upon his return to the United States, Keiley was ordained to the priesthood by Cardinal James Gibbons for the Diocese of Wilmington on December 31, 1873. Keiley then served as pastor of St. Peter's Parish in New Castle, Delaware until 1880, when he became rector of the pro-cathedral at Wilmington.

When Bishop Thomas A. Becker was appointed bishop of the Diocese of Savannah in 1886, Keiley asked the Vatican to be incardinated, or transferred, to the same diocese. He served as vicar general and pastor of Immaculate Conception Parish in Atlanta until 1896. He was rector of the Cathedral of St. John the Baptist in Savannah from 1896 to 1900.

Bishop of Savannah
On April 2, 1900, Keiley was appointed by Pope Leo XIII to succeed Becker as the seventh bishop of Savannah. He received his episcopal consecration on June 3, 1900, from Cardinal Gibbons, with Bishops Henry Northrop and John J. Monaghan serving as co-consecrators, at St. Peter's Cathedral in Richmond, Virginia. "One of the greatest challenges he faced during his tenure was a rabid anti-Catholicism."

During his tenure, Keiley completely restored the Cathedral of St. John the Baptist, which had been destroyed by fire in 1898; he dedicated the new edifice in October 1900. In other pronouncements, Keiley condemned prejudice and the lynchings of African-Americans. In 1902, Keiley memorialized Confederate veterans and praised former Confederate President Jefferson Davis, while condemning U.S. President Theodore Roosevelt for inviting the African-American educator Booker T. Washington to the White House.  Keiley opposed an initiative to set up a seminary for African-Americans in the diocese, saying: "In America no black man should be ordained. Just as illegitimate sons are declared irregular by canon law...so blacks can be declared irregular because they are held in such contempt by whites."Keiley was active in Confederate veteran organizations, and a frequent speaker at memorial services. In 1904, Keiley, who had served under Confederate General James Longstreet, said his funeral mass. Longstreet had converted to Catholicism in 1877.

In 1903, after a pronouncement by Pope Pius X on church music, Keiley prohibited his nuns from leading church choirs.  He complained to the Vatican that other dioceses in the United States were lenient on that rule.  In 1907, Keiley invited the Society of Missionaries of Africa to enter the diocese and build churches and schools for African-Americans.

Death 
Keiley's resignation as Bishop of the Savannah due to poor health was accepted by Pope Pius XI on March 18, 1922; he was appointed titular bishop of Scilium on the same date. Benjamin Keiley died in Atlanta on June 17, 1925 at age 77. At his funeral Mass, his bier was draped with a Confederate flag with a laurel wreath sent by the United Daughters of the Confederacy.

See also

 Catholic Church in the United States
 Historical list of the Catholic bishops of the United States
 List of Catholic bishops of the United States
 Lists of patriarchs, archbishops, and bishops

References

External links
Roman Catholic Diocese of Savannah

Episcopal succession

1847 births
1925 deaths
St. Charles College alumni
People from Petersburg, Virginia
American people of Irish descent
Roman Catholic Diocese of Wilmington
20th-century Roman Catholic bishops in the United States
Confederate States Army soldiers
Roman Catholic bishops of Savannah, Georgia
People of Virginia in the American Civil War
People from New Castle, Delaware
People from Wilmington, Delaware
Catholics from Virginia
Catholics from Delaware
19th-century American Roman Catholic priests